Lieutenant colonel Sir James Stuart Coats, 3rd Baronet MC (13 April 1894 – 26 October 1966) was a British skeleton racer who competed in the late 1940s. He finished seventh in the men's skeleton event at the 1948 Winter Olympics in St. Moritz.  He served as President of the St. Moritz Tobogganing Club from 1954 to 1956.

Coats was awarded the Military Cross in 1918.

Coats was a retired lieutenant colonel of the British Army at the time of the 1948 Winter Olympics. During World War II he commanded the Coats Mission charged with evacuating the royal family in the result of a German invasion.

References

1948 men's skeleton results
BBC.co.uk factoid featuring Coates prior to the 2002 Winter Olympics.
Gibbs, Roger (1985).  The Cresta Run 1885-1985.  London: Henry Melland Limited.  
Wallechinsky, David (1984). "Skeleton (Cresta Run)". In The Complete Book of the Olympics: 1896 – 1980. New York: Penguin Books. p. 577.
James Coats' profile at Sports Reference.com

1894 births
1966 deaths
Alumni of Magdalen College, Oxford
Coldstream Guards officers
Recipients of the Military Cross
British male skeleton racers
Skeleton racers at the 1948 Winter Olympics
Olympic skeleton racers of Great Britain
Baronets in the Baronetage of the United Kingdom
British Army personnel of World War II
Place of birth missing
Place of death missing